Marmol is a town and seat of Marmul District in Balkh Province in northern Afghanistan.

Marmol or Mármol may refer to:

People
Luis del Mármol Carvajal (born 1520), Spanish historical chronicler
Carlos Mármol (born 1982), Dominican former professional baseball relief pitcher
Fernando Tarrida del Mármol (1861–1915), Cuban anarchist writer
José Mármol (1818–1871), Argentine journalist, politician, librarian, and writer of the Romantic school
Leo Marmol, a partner in the architecture firm Marmol Radziner
Líder Mármol (born 1985), Paraguayan professional footballer
Lluis Lopez Marmol (born 1997), Spanish professional footballer
Manuel Sánchez Mármol (1839–1912), Mexican writer, journalist, lawyer, politician
Miguel Mármol (1905–1993), Salvadoran communist activist, founder of the Communist Party of El Salvador
Oliver Marmol (born 1986), manager of the St. Louis Cardinals of Major League Baseball
Rubén Pérez del Mármol (born 1989), Spanish footballer who plays for CD Leganés on loan from Granada CF as a defensive midfielder

Other
El coloso de mármol (The Marble Colossus), a 1929 Mexican silent drama film
Mármol Macael CD, Spanish football team founded in 1952 and based in Macael, Almería, in the autonomous community of Andalusia

See also
Marmol Radziner, Los Angeles-based design-build practice founded in 1989 by American architects Leo Marmol and Ron Radziner
José Mármol, Buenos Aires, a city in Argentina